Ryan Duncan may refer to:
 Ryan Duncan (ice hockey)
 Ryan Duncan (footballer)